20 Años Después is a compilation music album by Chilean singer-songwriter Victor Jara. It was released in Spain by Fonomusic in 1992 and was re-edited in 1998 with the 13th original track, "El Aparecido", omitted from the original compilation.

Track listing

References

External links
Victor Jara Foundation – Spanish Language
20 Años Después album text/lyrics and cover art
Biographical Notes: The Victor Jara Story

Víctor Jara compilation albums
1992 compilation albums
Spanish-language compilation albums